Calospeira elegans is a species of  dictyostelids, a type of slime molds.

References

External links 

 
 Calospeira elegans at Mycobank

Species described in 1949
Mycetozoa